Caspian can refer to:

The Caspian Sea
The Caspian Depression, surrounding the northern part of the Caspian Sea
The Caspians, the ancient people living near the Caspian Sea
Caspian languages, collection of languages and dialects of Caspian people

In fiction
 Prince Caspian, a book in the Chronicles of Narnia series by C. S. Lewis
 Caspian X, "Prince Caspian", a prince of the Telmarines
 The Chronicles of Narnia: Prince Caspian, a film based on the novel by C. S. Lewis
Caspian (Highlander), a fictional character on Highlander: The Series
 Judson Caspian, alter-ego of one of three characters named the Reaper (DC Comics)

Other uses
Caspian horse, a small horse breed native to Northern Iran
Caspian tiger, a panthera tigris population native Northern Iran and Caucasus
Caspian Airlines, an airline based in Tehran, Iran
Caspian (band), an instrumental post-rock band
Caspian, Michigan, a small city in the United States
USS Caspian (ID-1380), proposed designation for a tug that never actually served in the United States Navy